Armillifer is a genus of tongue worms in the subclass Pentastomida. It contains the following species:

Armillifer aborealis 
Armillifer agkistrodontis 
Armillifer armillatus 
Armillifer australis 
Armillifer grandis 
Armillifer mazzai 
Armillifer moniliformis 
Armillifer yoshidai

References

Crustaceans